"When I Stop Leaving (I'll Be Gone)" is a song written by Kent Robbins, and recorded by American country music artist Charley Pride.  It was released in May 1978 as the first single from his album Burgers and Fries/When I Stop Leaving (I'll Be Gone).  The song peaked at number 3 on the Billboard Hot Country Singles chart. It also reached number 1 on the RPM Country Tracks chart in Canada.

Chart performance

References

1978 singles
1978 songs
Charley Pride songs
Songs written by Kent Robbins
RCA Records singles